David Makovsky (born June 21, 1960) is the Ziegler distinguished fellow and director of the Washington Institute for Near East Policy Project on the Middle East Peace Process.

In addition, he is adjunct professor at Johns Hopkins University's Paul H. Nitze School of Advanced International Studies (SAIS) in the Middle Eastern studies program.

He is coauthor of the book Myths, Illusions, & Peace with Dennis Ross. Mr. Makovsky's commentary on U.S. policy towards the Middle East and Middle East peace process has been broadcast on the PBS NewsHour with Jim Lehrer. His writings can be found in The New York Times, The Wall Street Journal, The Washington Post, and Foreign Affairs.

Education, career and personal life
David Makovsky received his bachelor's degree from  Columbia University and his master's in Middle East studies from Harvard University.

From 1989 to 2000, David Makovsky extensively covered the peace process between Israel and the Palestinians, in his roles as executive editor and editor-in-chief (1999-2000) of The Jerusalem Post, and diplomatic correspondent for Israel's major daily Haaretz. During this time, he also served as special Jerusalem correspondent to U.S. News & World Report, for which he subsequently served as contributing editor.

He was recognized for his accomplishments in journalism in 1994, when he was awarded the National Press Club's Edwin M. Hood Award for Diplomatic Correspondence, in recognition for his cover story on PLO finances that he co-wrote for the magazine.

In July of that year, Mr. Makovsky became the first journalist writing for an Israeli publication to visit Damascus. This had been made possible with the personal intervention of then Secretary of State Warren Christopher. Mr. Makovsky would go on to make five trips to Syria.

Mr. Makovsky also made history in March 1995 when he was given unprecedented permission, with the help of U.S. officials, to file reports from Jeddah, Saudi Arabia, for an Israeli publication.

The Washington Institute for Near East Policy

Currently, David Makovsky is Senior Fellow and the Ziegler distinguished fellow at the Washington Institute for Near East Policy (WINEP). The Washington Institute was founded in 1985 with the goal of helping advance U.S. interests in the Middle East.

The Washington Institute has a senior research staff whose expertise cover a wide variety of the issues relevant in the Middle East, including political, military, security, and economic issues. Most speak the native languages of the Middle East, have lived and worked there, and frequently are from the region themselves.

The experts of the Washington Institute are often quoted in major American and international media, interviewed on network television and radio programs, and featured as authors of op-eds in influential newspapers.

In addition, the Institute publishes material that is generally recognized by journalists, officials, and diplomats as "must reading". Both in and out of Washington, the Institute's policy briefs, monographs, and other publications are read by those seeking immediate analysis of current events and long term assessments of trends in Middle East issues.

At its inception, the Institute's main focus was on Arab-Israeli issues and overall U.S. Middle East policy. In the 1990s, the scope of the Institute's research grew as the Soviet Union fell and the first Gulf War took place. This expansion included a particular focus on Turkey and the rise of Islamic politics in understanding the political trends in the post-Soviet Middle East.

The range of issues covered by the Institute expanded once again after September 11, this time driven by the focus of the U.S. on the Middle East as a central foreign policy concern. The Institute has thus dedicated new resources to assist the U.S. government in understanding and countering Islamist extremism, terrorism, and nuclear proliferation.

The ultimate hope of the Washington Institute is to see a more stable, secure, and prosperous Middle East. It is the work of the Institute to aid the American leadership with the ideas and talents of people who can understand and shape policy.

Published work

David Makovsky is the author of the books Making Peace With The PLO: The Rabin Government's Road To The Oslo Accord, Engagement Through Disengagement: Gaza and the Potential for Renewed Israeli-Palestinian Peacemaking, and more recently Myths, Illusions, & Peace: Finding a New Direction for America in the Middle East. Myths, Illusions, & Peace, coauthored with Dennis Ross, sets out to prove the many myths about the Middle East false, and help set a new course for American foreign policy in the Middle East.

In addition, he is the author or coauthor of several Washington Institute monographs, including
Lessons and Implications of the Israel-Hizballah War: A Preliminary Assessment (2006); Olmert's Unilateral Option: An Early Assessment (2006); Hamas Triumphant (2006); Engagement Through Disengagement: Gaza and the Potential for Israeli-Palestinian Peacemaking (2005); A Defensible Fence: Fighting Terror and Enabling a Two State Solution (2004).

David Makovsky also wrote Making Peace with the PLO: The Rabin Government's Road to the Oslo Accord (Washington Institute/Westview Press/HarperCollins, 1996); and contributed to a collection on U.S. involvement in the First Gulf War, Triumph without Victory (Random House, 1992).

David Makovsky is also the author of many op-ed pieces, which have appeared in publications such as New York Daily News, USA Today, The Wall Street Journal, and The Jerusalem Post.

Media
David Makovsky's commentary on the Arab–Israeli conflict have appeared in The New York Times, The Washington Post, the Los Angeles Times, The Wall Street Journal, the Financial Times, the International Herald Tribune, the Chicago Tribune, Foreign Affairs, Foreign Policy, and The National Interest.

Also, he has appeared on PBS NewsHour with Jim Lehrer, Charlie Rose, the Mimi Geerges Show, National Public Radio, C-SPAN, Voice of America, Alhurra Free Hour and others.

Myths, Illusions, & Peace
Among the areas covered in Myths, Illusions, & Peace are the Israeli–Palestinian conflict, Iran, and the history behind the current events in these regions.

The book has been widely praised and well received by many interested in the Middle East. David Makovsky has been interviewed several times, the book reviewed in several media outlets, and a book signing event held to discuss Myths, Illusions, & Peace. The Advance Praise on the back of the book gives an idea of the impression that the book has made:

"Ross and Makovsky are superb guides to the political bazaar known as the Middle East. Myths, Illusions, and Peace sheds new light on old dilemmas at a moment when fresh approaches to the Middle East are urgently needed, widely desired, and genuinely possible. This is a book written to be appreciated by experts and novices alike."
—Madeleine K. Albright, U.S. Secretary of State

"This book is like an advanced course in Middle East politics. Whether you are an expert or not, you will learn a lot and gain fresh understanding about a range of difficult issues. Besides the many insights of the book, what emerges is that the authors share a belief in Middle East peace."
—Abdul Rahman Al-Rashed, Head of Al-Arabiya Arab Satellite Television Network

"This compelling book is an insightful testament to the authors' profound grasp of Middle East history and its development into today's contemporary reality. By dispelling myths that have captivated too many for too long in our region and beyond its shores, they bring to their analysis much needed fresh focus and lucid thinking, a significant contribution to building a better future for all the peoples of the Middle East."
—Shimon Peres, President of Israel

"I rely on the work of Dennis Ross and David Makovsky for deep strategic thinking. I value their research and analysis. I consider their work a national treasure of the United States."
—Lieutenant General Keith Dayton, United States Security Coordinator for Israel and the Palestinian Authority

"Ross and Makovsky cogently blend the experience of diplomacy with the clarity of seasoned expertise. Anchored in astute political analyses, their book not only debunks widely and wildly held myths inherent in the Middle East's most daunting issues, it offers clear prescriptions for this and future administrations. A mandated read for students, diplomats, and presidents alike."
—Kenneth W. Stein, William E. Schatten Professor of Contemporary Middle Eastern History and Political Science, Emory University

References

Sources

 "David Makovsky". 28 June 2015. https://www.washingtoninstitute.org/experts/view/makovsky-david
 "Our History". 20 August 2009. http://washingtoninstitute.org/templateC11.php?CID=20&newActiveSubNav=Our%20History&activeSubNavLink=templateC11.php%3FCID%3D20&newActiveNav=aboutUs
"Op-Ed Articles Recently Published by David Makovsky". 20 August 2009. http://davidmakovsky.com
"Interview Given by David Makovsky". 20 August 2009. https://web.archive.org/web/20100906103729/http://www.davidmakovsky.com/category/interview-given-by-david-makovsky
"Myths, Illusions, & Peace: Finding a New Direction for America in the Middle East". 20 August 2009. http://washingtoninstitute.org/templateC04.php?CID=310

External links
The Washington Institute for Near East Policy
David Makovsky, Washington Institute
New Yorker

1960 births
Harvard University alumni
Columbia College (New York) alumni
Johns Hopkins University people
Living people
The Jerusalem Post editors